Heterobrenthus is a genus of primitive weevils in the beetle family Brentidae. There are at least three described species in Heterobrenthus.

Species
These three species belong to the genus Heterobrenthus:
 Heterobrenthus distans Sharp, 1895
 Heterobrenthus lacordairei (Power, 1878)
 Heterobrenthus texanus Schaeffer, 1915

References

Further reading

 
 
 

Brentidae
Articles created by Qbugbot